The AIRPod is a compressed-air vehicle in development by Motor Development International. The AIRPod is planned to be produced in three different configurations that will vary the number of seats and amount of cargo storage while keeping the same basic chassis. It is designed as a zero-emission urban vehicle. Prototypes have been tested by KLM/AirFrance for use as emission-free vehicles in airports.

MDI has been promising production of the AirPod each year since 2000. As of October 2018, not a single production car has been created. Zero Pollution Motors promised production by mid-2019.

Technical characteristics 
(Range, mileage, and speed are claimed by MDI with no independent verification)

Production model 
In September 2013, it was claimed that the vehicle would be on sale from summer 2014 with a base model with 100 km range starting at 7000 Euros, and one with an improved engine, that uses some fuel in addition to the compressed air, giving 250 km range for 8000 Euros. The vehicles will be manufactured in Bolotana, Sardinia, Italy.
In August 2014, MDI posted photos of a partially completed demonstration assembly line in their Carros R&D facility, and illustrations and descriptions of the proposed finished assembly line.  In March 2016, they posted images showing construction of the forthcoming factory in Sardinia as "underway".

US production and sales  
The vehicles were promoted on the US reality television show Shark Tank in May 2015 by Zero Pollution Motors, where Robert Herjavec offered $5 million for a 50% share in the business which proposed to sell the AirPod for $10,000.  Zero Pollution Motors owns the right to build a production plant and has proposed setting up a plant in Hawaii. The investment deal fell through because the company did not hold the rights across North America.  The company's website said production in Europe was to be scheduled for the first quarter of 2018 and would accept order reservations.

See also 
 Compressed air car

References

External links 
 AIRPod 2.0 Web Page
 Motor Development International Website
 Zero Pollution Motors

Alternative fuels
Economy of Sardinia